Algona High School is a rural public high school  located in the Algona Community School District in Algona, Iowa, United States. The Algona district serves Algona, Burt, Titonka, and Whittemore. In addition, since 2015 the Lu Verne Community School District sends its secondary students to Algona secondary schools, and the Lu Verne district serves Lu Verne, Corwith, and Wesley.

The building opened in 1970, replacing the 1931 building and annex. The school is known for running its own public television channel (channel 4 TV) and having its own scholarship foundation.

Athletics 
The Bulldogs compete in the North Central Conference in the following sports:

Cross Country 
 Boys' 2008 Class 3A State Champions
Volleyball 
Football 
Basketball
Swimming 
Wrestling
 6-time State Champions (1966, 1969, 1970, 1972, 1975, 1980)
Track and Field
 Boys' 1993 Class 3A State Champions
Golf 
 Boys' 1987 Class 3A State Champions
 Girls' 2-time Class 2A State Champions (1996, 1997)
Baseball 
Softball

Notable alumni 
 Dick Dale (1943), best known as a featured singer and saxophone player on the television variety show The Lawrence Welk Show.

See also
List of high schools in Iowa

References

External links
 Algona High School

Algona, Iowa
Public high schools in Iowa
Schools in Kossuth County, Iowa
1970 establishments in Iowa